Richard David Borresen (born March 16, 1964) is a former American football tight end in the National Football League for the Dallas Cowboys. He played college football at Northwestern University.

Early years
Borresen attended Valley Stream North High School, where he participated in football and track. He enrolled at Nassau Community College, and was named the starting tight end. He transferred to Northwestern University after his first year.

He was a two-year starter and was mostly used for blocking purposes. As a sophomore, he was a backup behind Ralph Jackson, appearing in 9 games with 10 receptions for 75 yards. As a junior, he was limited with injuries, appearing in 3 games with 10 receptions for 100 yards.

As a senior, he appeared in 11 games, recording 25 receptions for 331 yards and one touchdown. Against Army, he had 6 receptions for 95 yards. He received AP second-team All-Big Ten and UPI honorable-mention All-American honors.

Professional career
Borresen was signed as an undrafted free agent by the Dallas Cowboys after the 1987 NFL Draft. He was waived on July 30.

After the NFLPA strike was declared on the third week of the 1987 season, those contests were canceled (reducing the 16 game season to 15) and the NFL decided that the games would be played with replacement players. He was re-signed to be a part of the Dallas replacement team that was given the mock name "Rhinestone Cowboys" by the media. He started 3 games and was used for blocking purposes, registering only a 5-yard kickoff return. He was released on October 26, at the end of the strike.

Personal life
Borresen works in the construction industry, after co-founding the company PRB Innovations with his brother in 1991.

References

1964 births
Living people
Sportspeople from Queens, New York
Players of American football from New York City
American football tight ends
Nassau Lions football players
Northwestern Wildcats football players
Dallas Cowboys players
National Football League replacement players
Valley Stream North High School alumni